The Vought V-326 (alternatively Vought-Sikorsky VS-326) was an American experimental aircraft used by Pratt & Whitney as a high altitude engine test bed.

Design and development 
Vought began work on the V-326 in 1941 at the request of Pratt & Whitney.  Designed as a test bed for the R-4360 Wasp Major radial engine, the aircraft was based on the XTBU-1 Sea Wolf and used components from the F4U Corsair.  The V-326 was a low-wing monoplane with a pressurized two-seat cockpit.  Its main landing gear rotated 90 degrees and retracted rearward into the wings.  In the rear fuselage was a compartment for ballast.  The engine's carburetor was fed by a scoop situated ahead of the vertical stabilizer.

Operational history 
The V-326 made its first flight on June 18, 1943 at the hands of P&W chief test pilot A. Lewis McClain.  Harold B. Archer flew most subsequent flights, with pressurization troubles keeping most flights below .

The second aircraft, the V-326A, made its first and only flight on August 30, 1944.  It subsequently underwent modifications, though they were not completed as the need for the aircraft faded.  Both aircraft were scrapped in 1946, the V-326 having only 111 hours logged.

Variants 
V-326
First aircraft with a deep cowling enclosing the supercharger and a three-bladed propeller.

V-326A
Second aircraft with a tight cowling, intakes under the wings feeding the twin superchargers, and a four-bladed propeller.

Specifications (V-326)

See also

References 

Single-engined tractor aircraft
Low-wing aircraft
Vought aircraft
1940s United States experimental aircraft